Haukelandshallen is an indoor sport arena in Årstad borough, Bergen, Norway.  It holds 5,000 people.  The arena hosts mainly team handball matches, is the home arena for Tertnes HE and hosted the 2008 European Men's Handball Championship. The basketball team Ulriken Eagles also plays there.

Sports venues in Bergen
Handball venues in Norway
Indoor arenas in Norway
1970 establishments in Norway